Teprenone (or geranylgeranylacetone), sold under the brand name Selbex, is a medication used for the treatment of gastric ulcers.

References

Drugs acting on the gastrointestinal system and metabolism
Terpenes and terpenoids
Ketones
Alkene derivatives